Estradiol phenylpropionate (EPP), also known as estradiol 17β-phenylpropionate and sold under the brand name Menformon Prolongatum, is an estrogen which is no longer marketed. It is an estrogen ester, specifically the C17β phenylpropionate ester of estradiol.

EPP has been marketed in combination with estradiol benzoate under the brand name Dimenformon Prolongatum in Europe and in combination with estradiol benzoate, testosterone propionate, testosterone phenylpropionate, and testosterone isocaproate under the brand names Mixogen, Estandron Prolongatum, and Lynandron Prolongatum (a balanced mixture of estradiol and testosterone esters) in menopausal hormone therapy. Both of these medication combinations are long-acting injectables indicated in hormone replacement therapy for women in menopause. Dimenformon Prolongatum has also been investigated as a single injection, "morning after" post-coital contraceptive, and is additionally used as a component of hormone replacement therapy for transgender women.

The pharmacokinetics of EPP in combination with estradiol benzoate have been studied.

See also
 List of estrogen esters § Estradiol esters
 Estradiol benzoate/estradiol phenylpropionate/testosterone propionate/testosterone phenylpropionate/testosterone isocaproate
 Estradiol benzoate/estradiol phenylpropionate

References

Abandoned drugs
Estradiol esters
Phenylpropionate esters
Prodrugs
Synthetic estrogens